Stanton Airport  is a public airport located one mile (1.6 km) east of the central business district (CBD) of Stanton, a city in Powell County, Kentucky, United States.

The airport currently is undergoing renovations and is expected to be completed in 2007, with an additional hangar for three aircraft and an on-site flight school and airframe/mechanic school.

Runways 
 Runway 6 - 2780' Asphalt in good condition
 Runway 24 - 3000' Asphalt in good condition

References 
Airport Master Record (FAA Form 5010), also available as a printable form (PDF)

External links 

Airports in Kentucky
Buildings and structures in Powell County, Kentucky
Transportation in Powell County, Kentucky